Dan Campbell (born July 11, 1978) is an American biathlete. He competed in the men's 20 km individual event at the 2002 Winter Olympics.

References

External links
 

1978 births
Living people
American male biathletes
Olympic biathletes of the United States
Biathletes at the 2002 Winter Olympics
Sportspeople from Minneapolis
Skiers from Minneapolis